Albertus ("Bertus") Johannes Erasmus (born 17 December 1977 in Harare – then Salisbury) is a Zimbabwean cricketer. Erasmus captained the Zimbabwean Under-19 Test team in 1997, losing two games and drawing once against England. He has now given up cricket to become a chartered accountant.

References
Bertus Erasmus page on Cricinfo

1977 births
Afrikaner people
Living people
Zimbabwean cricketers
Zimbabwean Under-19 ODI captains
Zimbabwean Under-19 Test captains
Mashonaland cricketers
White Zimbabwean sportspeople